John Prescott (born 1938) is a British former politician who served as Deputy Prime Minister.

John Prescott may also refer to:
 John Prescott (died 1412) (1327–1412), English MP for Exeter, Totnes and Devon
 John B. Prescott (born 1940), Australian CEO of BHP
 John Robert Victor Prescott (1931–2018), Australian geographer
 Jack Prescott (c.1880–1959), American silent film actor and director
 Jack Prescott (rugby league) (1890–1989), English rugby league footballer who played in the 1900s, 1910s and 1920s
 Johnny Prescott (1938–2012), English boxer of the 1960s and 1970s

See also
Jon Prescott (born 1981), American actor